Ringerike District Court (Norwegian: Ringerike tingrett) is a district court located in Hønefoss, Norway.  It covers the municipalities of Hole, Ringerike and  Jevnaker  and is subordinate to the Borgarting Court of Appeal.

References 

Defunct district courts of Norway
Organisations based in Ringerike (municipality)